Taxi Orange was an alternative to the Big Brother reality show, quite popular in Austria. It was broadcast by the public television channel ORF. The idea, like Big Brother, was to lock up a group of people in a closed environment, only allowed to leave operating an orange taxi within the city of Vienna as a source of income and interaction with the world outside.

The habitat and the taxi interior were videotaped and used to produce a 30-minute daily summary. Each week, viewers elected a winner who had to decide on the exclusion of one colleague. The winner received 1 million Schillings. Two seasons (2000, 2001) were produced.

Austrian television series
ORF (broadcaster) original programming
2000 Austrian television series debuts
2001 Austrian television series endings
2000s Austrian television series
German-language television shows